Petrou is a Greek surname. People with this surname include:

Maria Petrou (1953–2012), Greek-born British computer scientist 
Kostas Petrou (born 1959), British boxer of Greek Cypriot descent
Nicolas Petrou (born 1967), Cypriot-born American fashion designer
Sokratis Petrou (born 1979), Greek footballer
Ioannis Petrou (born 1996), Greek rower
David Michael Petrou, American film producer
George Petrou, Greek conductor and pianist
Aristos Petrou, American musician known for being in the New Orleans duo Suicideboys
Thomas Petrou, American social media personality

Greek-language surnames
Surnames from given names